Pilgermann is a 1983 novel by Russell Hoban, set in the Middle Ages and depicting the journey of a Jew across Europe and Northern Africa on his way to the Holy Land. The novel was reissued in January 2002.

Plot summary
Narrated by the disembodied spirit or consciousness of Pilgermann, a European Jew, the novel opens with the newly castrated Pilgermann having a vision of Christ after sleeping with a merchant's wife and subsequently being mutilated by a gentile mob. Christ tells Pilgermann that he must make his way to Jerusalem where he will meet with Sophia. Reluctantly, and in theory with nothing better to do, Pilgermann sets off.

As Pilgermann travels across Europe he is joined by other characters, including his own Death which walks alongside him. Life in Europe is seen through a series of grotesque, Brueghel- and Bosch-like images of horror, violence, degradation and death. Nevertheless, Pilgermann continues, keeping his cool with a mixture of detachment, compassion and irony throughout.

Halfway across the Mediterranean his boat is ambushed by pirates who sell him to a Muslim grandee in Antioch in Syria, Bembel Redzuk. Pilgermann and Bembel become friends, although never social equals (as a Jew Pilgermann can only ever be a dhimmi in Muslim society). Pilgermann conceives of, designs and builds an enormous Kabbalistic courtyard and tower with a patterned design on the floor for Bembel which rapidly takes on numinous power among the community, attracting the displeasure of the Islamic authorities. Things come to a head when Frankish crusaders besiege Antioch. As it becomes increasingly clear that the city will fall, the Islamic authorities become more and more suspicious of non-Muslims and Pilgermann's life becomes increasingly threatened. Finally the city falls and Bembel and Pilgermann are killed fighting a crusader, but not before Pilgermann has a vision of Jerusalem - which he is never destined to get to - and sees Sophia lying, dying among a pile of corpses after a crusader massacre.

Major themes
Pilgermann is a historical fantasy which deals with the relationship between Judaism, Christianity and Islam. At the time of the book's setting Islam was the most technologically and culturally advanced of the three cultures and this is reflected in the comparatively sympathetic portrayal of Bembel and Muslim society as opposed to the brutality and hardship of European, Christian life.

The book is suffused with Kabbalistic, Sufi and Christian mystical imagery, including references to the Tarot, the work of artists such as Brueghel and Bosch, the Gnostic idea of the Sophia and many others. The European scenes are often reminiscent of Ingmar Bergman's film The Seventh Seal. It was written after Hoban's post-apocalyptic novel Riddley Walker, which portrayed a future state for the world reminiscent of the Middle Ages.

Reception
The New York Times said Pilgermann was wonderful despite not outperforming Hoban's previous book Riddley Walker while Kirkus Reviews had mixed opinions about the book.

Dave Langford reviewed Pilgermann for White Dwarf #54, and stated that "Pilgermann is part historical novel, part fantasy (Pilgermann converses with dead folk, Christ and Death himself), part theological, wholly recommended."

References

1983 British novels
Novels set in the Middle Ages
Novels by Russell Hoban